Taupaki is a locality in the Rodney District, which is a part of the Auckland Region in New Zealand. Kumeu lies to the north-west, Whenuapai to the north-east, West Harbour to the east, Massey to the south-east, Swanson to the south, and Waitākere, Auckland to the south-west. The North Auckland Line runs through the area.

History

The area is traditionally a part of rohe of the tribe Te Kawerau ā Maki, who referred to the wider area was known as Te Kumeū. The name, meaning "the firmly bound peace", refers to a location on the coast near Muriwai, which became the border between Te Kawerau ā Maki and Ngāti Whātua lands in the early 18th century. The foothills to the west and south-west of the township were traditionally known as Ngā Rau Pou ā Maki, referring to the eponymous ancestor of Te Kawerau ā Maki.

Demographics

Taupaki had a population of 1,617 at the 2018 New Zealand census, an increase of 99 people (6.5%) since the 2013 census, and an increase of 165 people (11.4%) since the 2006 census. There were 525 households, comprising 774 males and 846 females, giving a sex ratio of 0.91 males per female. The median age was 43.1 years (compared with 37.4 years nationally), with 288 people (17.8%) aged under 15 years, 285 (17.6%) aged 15 to 29, 762 (47.1%) aged 30 to 64, and 285 (17.6%) aged 65 or older.

Ethnicities were 88.9% European/Pākehā, 8.9% Māori, 3.9% Pacific peoples, 7.4% Asian, and 2.2% other ethnicities. People may identify with more than one ethnicity.

The percentage of people born overseas was 19.5, compared with 27.1% nationally.

Although some people chose not to answer the census's question about religious affiliation, 59.0% had no religion, 31.0% were Christian, 0.4% were Hindu, 0.2% were Muslim, 0.7% were Buddhist and 2.8% had other religions.

Of those at least 15 years old, 267 (20.1%) people had a bachelor's or higher degree, and 231 (17.4%) people had no formal qualifications. The median income was $37,200, compared with $31,800 nationally. 300 people (22.6%) earned over $70,000 compared to 17.2% nationally. The employment status of those at least 15 was that 684 (51.5%) people were employed full-time, 234 (17.6%) were part-time, and 30 (2.3%) were unemployed.

Education
The school was established in 1899 and celebrated its centenary in 1999.

Notes

External links
 Taupaki School website

Rodney Local Board Area
Populated places in the Auckland Region
West Auckland, New Zealand